Souto may refer to:

People
 Antonio Mariño Souto, Cuban painter
 Carlos Souto, Argentinian advertising executive
 Rodrigo Souto, Brazilian footballer
 Ronny Souto, Cape Verdean footballer

Places

Portugal
 Souto (Abrantes), a civil parish in the municipality of Abrantes
 Souto (Arcos de Valdevez), a civil parish in the municipality of Arcos de Valdevez
 Souto (Guimarães), a civil parish in the municipality of Guimarães
 Souto (Penedono), a civil parish in the municipality of Penedono
 Souto (Pombal), a civil parish in the municipality of Pombal
 Souto (Sabugal), a civil parish in the municipality of Sabugal
 Souto (Santa Maria da Feira), a civil parish in the municipality of Santa Maria da Feira
 Souto (São Salvador), a civil parish in the municipality of São Salvador
 Souto (Terras de Bouro), a civil parish in the municipality of Terras de Bouro
 Souto Maior (Sabrosa), a civil parish in the municipality of Sabrosa
 Souto Maior (Trancoso), a civil parish in the municipality of Trancoso

Spain
 Souto (A Coruña), a civil parish in the municipality of A Coruña
 Souto (Ourense), a civil parish in the municipality of Ourense
 Souto (O Carballiño), a civil parish in the municipality of O Carballiño
 Souto (Pontevedra), a civil parish in the province of Pontevedra
 Souto (Pantón), a civil parish in the municipality of Pantón
 Souto (Bóveda), a hamlet in the civil parish of Teilán in the municipality of Bóveda
Other variants
 Souto de Aguiar da Beira, a civil parish in the municipality of Aguiar da Beira 
 Souto da Carpalhosa, a civil parish in the municipality of Leiria 
 Souto da Casa, a civil parish in the municipality of Fundão
 Souto de Lafões, a civil parish in the municipality of Oliveira de Frades 
 Souto da Velha, a civil parish in the municipality of Torre de Moncorvo

See also
Soto (disambiguation)